La Toussuire is a ski resort in the Maurienne Valley, located in the commune of Fontcouverte-la-Toussuire, in the Savoie department in the Auvergne-Rhône-Alpes region. It is a part of Les Sybelles.

The station was opened in 1923. It is also used regularly as the finish of cycle races including the Tour de France and the Critérium du Dauphiné.

Cycle racing 
The 16th stage of the 2006 Tour de France arrived in La Toussuire as did Stage 11 of the 2012 Tour 
and Stage 19 of the 2015 Tour. 
The first of two L'Étape du Tours followed the route of Stage 11 on 8 July 2012 with a finish at La Toussuire – Les Sybelles.

Details of the climb
There is a shorter and steeper route via Saint-Pancrace (17.6 km. at 6.5%).

Tour de France winners

Critérium du Dauphiné winners

References

External links

Official English site
La Toussuire ski resort guide
Profiles of the climbs on www.climbbybike.com
 Preview of Stage 11 of the 2012 Tour de France to La Toussuire

Ski areas and resorts in France
Sports venues in Savoie
Tourist attractions in Savoie